Jalalabad (also Romanized as Jalālābād; also known as Jalīlābād) is a village in Dowlatabad Rural District, in the Central District of Jiroft County, Kerman Province, Iran. At the 2006 census, its population was 174, in 41 families.

References 

Populated places in Jiroft County